The UK-Canada Trade Continuity Agreement (TCA) is a free trade agreement between the United Kingdom and Canada. Discussions had been ongoing between both parties during the Brexit transition period. A deal was finally agreed upon on November 21, 2020, signed on December 8, and entered into force on 1 April 2021. The agreement is mostly a rollover of the CETA agreement but could pave the way to a deeper free trade agreement between Canada and the UK.

History 
As the United Kingdom withdrew from the European Union in January 2020, both the UK and Canada sought to replicate the Comprehensive Economic and Trade Agreement (CETA) to avoid any disruption of trade after the Brexit transition period ends on 31 December 2020. 
Negotiations for the trade agreement began at the beginning of 2020,  a deal was finally agreed upon on November 21, 2020. The agreement was signed on December 8, 2020, and entered into force on 1 April 2021. Canadian Prime Minister Justin Trudeau described the deal as an "easy one".

Trade & Investment 
The benefits locked in under the agreement reached include:

- Future zero tariffs on UK car exports to Canada, which were worth £757 million in 2019, supporting factories and jobs in communities. Without this agreement, Canada's standard tariffs on cars of 6.1% would have applied.

- Tariff-free trade on 98% of goods that can be exported to Canada including beef, fish and seafood and soft drinks. 

- UK and Canadian producers will continue to benefit from zero tariffs on many agricultural and seafood exports including chocolate, confectionery, fruit and vegetables, bread, pastries and fish.
Without the continuity agreement, Canadian food products such as maple syrup, biscuits and salmon could have been more expensive for British consumers as they would have faced taxes of up to 8% when entering the UK under the UK Global Tariff.

Overall, the terms of the UK-Canada Trade Continuity Agreement are the same as the Comprehensive Economic and Trade Agreement. The text of the Agreement is expected to be released once it is signed by both parties.

See also 

 List of Bilateral Agreements
 List of Multilateral Agreements
 UK Free Trade Agreements

References 

 
 

Free trade agreements of the United Kingdom
Free trade agreements of Canada